Alessandro Pittin, (born 11 February 1990 in Tolmezzo) is an Italian nordic combined athlete from Ski club Aldo Moro Paluzza.

Career
In the World Cup at Schonach in 2009, Pittin came in 9th place. He had previously won the Junior World Championships in Zakopane 2008. He has also competed in other FIS Nordic Combined World Cup competitions and has won several junior, and amateur competitions such as Fis Race and the Alpen Cup as well as the B-World Cup. Pittin has skis from Fischer. At the moment, he resides in Cercivento, Udine, Italy. Pittin's only major injury was when he broke his arm while ski jumping.

Pittin is the first Italian to medal in Nordic combined at the Winter Olympics with his bronze in the 10 km individual normal hill event at the 2010 Winter Olympics in Vancouver.

Further notable results
 2007: 2nd, Italian championships of Nordic combined skiing, sprint
 2008: 1st, Italian championships of Nordic combined skiing, sprint
 2009:
 1st, Italian championships of Nordic combined skiing
 1st, Italian championships of Nordic combined skiing, sprint
 2010:
 1st, Italian championships of Nordic combined skiing
 1st, Italian championships of Nordic combined skiing, sprint
 2011: 1st, Italian championships of Nordic combined skiing

References

External links
 
 
 
 

1990 births
Living people
People from Tolmezzo
Italian male Nordic combined skiers
Nordic combined skiers at the 2006 Winter Olympics
Nordic combined skiers at the 2010 Winter Olympics
Nordic combined skiers at the 2014 Winter Olympics
Nordic combined skiers at the 2018 Winter Olympics
Nordic combined skiers at the 2022 Winter Olympics
Olympic bronze medalists for Italy
Olympic Nordic combined skiers of Italy
Olympic medalists in Nordic combined
Medalists at the 2010 Winter Olympics
FIS Nordic World Ski Championships medalists in Nordic combined
Nordic combined skiers of Fiamme Gialle
Sportspeople from Friuli-Venezia Giulia
21st-century Italian people